HMS Dunoon was a Hunt-class minesweeper of the Aberdare sub-class built for the Royal Navy during World War I. She was not finished in time to participate in the First World War and was sunk by a mine in 1940.

Design and description
The Aberdare sub-class were enlarged versions of the original Hunt-class ships with a more powerful armament. The ships displaced  at normal load. The ships' complement consisted of 74 officers and ratings.

The ships had two vertical triple-expansion steam engines, each driving one shaft, using steam provided by two Yarrow boilers.

The Aberdare sub-class was armed with a quick-firing (QF)  gun forward of the bridge and a QF twelve-pounder (76.2 mm) anti-aircraft gun aft. Some ships were fitted with six- or three-pounder guns in lieu of the twelve-pounder.

Construction and career
HMS Dunoon was built by the Clyde Shipbuilding Company. In November 1939 she was sweeping for mines around Malta. The following month she was recalled to England, stopping at Gibraltar for fuel. She then worked in the North Sea as part of the 4th Minesweeping Flotilla, based at Great Yarmouth. In April 1940 she struck a mine at Smith's Knoll near Great Yarmouth and sank with the loss of 3 officers and 23 ratings.

Fiction
HMS Dunoon is featured in the 1958 book The Dragon Tree by Victor Canning

See also
Dunoon, Scotland

Notes

References
 
 
 

 

Hunt-class minesweepers (1916)
Royal Navy ship names
World War II shipwrecks in the North Sea
1919 ships
Maritime incidents in April 1940
Ships sunk by mines